Grupo Desportivo Direito is a Portuguese rugby union team in Lisbon. It is one of the most successful teams in Portugal, having won the Campeonato Nacional Honra/Super Bock 10 times, in 1998/99, 1999/00, 2001/02, 2004/05, 2005/06, 2008/09, 2009/10, 2010/11, 2012/2013 and 2014/2015 the Division II National Champsionhip once, in 1996/97, and the Taça de Portugal de Rugby, 9 times, in 1975/76, 1980/81, 1981/82, 2001/02, 2003/04, 2004/05, 2007/08, 2013/14 and 2015/2016.

Honors
Campeonato Nacional Honra/Super Bock:
Winner (11): 1998/99, 1999/00, 2001/02, 2004/05, 2005/06, 2008/09, 2009/10, 2010/11, 2012/13, 2014/15 and 2015/16
Taça de Portugal de Rugby: 
Winner (9): 1975/76, 1980/81, 1981/82, 2001/02, 2003/04, 2004/05, 2007/08, 2013/14 and 2015/16
Taça Ibérica: 
Winner (4): 2000, 2003, 2013, 2015
Supertaça de Portugal de Rugby: 
Winner (11): 1999, 2000, 2002, 2004, 2006, 2008, 2009, 2010, 2013, 2014, 2015

External links
Official site
Grupo Desportivo Direito at Blogspot

Direito
University and college sports clubs in Portugal